Muhammad Ifrahim (born August 14, 1944) is a Pakistani singer who is known for his national songs like, "Zameen ki goad rang se umang se" and others.

Early life and family 
Muhammad Ifrahim was born in Delhi, India in 1944 and migrated to Pakistan in 1965. He lives in Karachi with his wife, three daughters and a son.

Singing career 
Ifrahim was inspired by the Indian playback singer Mohammad Rafi and also got some music training from him while still in India. After coming to Pakistan, he sang his first song for movie, "Jaag Utha Insaan"(1966) under the composition of musician Lal Mohammad Iqbal. Then he rendered his voice in a few more films but didn't have any luck as a playback singer. Meanwhile, he started singing semi-classical songs and 'ghazals' for Radio Pakistan and Pakistan Television. Eventually, in 1978, he was offered a national song, "Zameen ki goad rang se umang se bhari rahe" which was composed by the famous musician Sohail Rana. When vocalized by Ifrahim, the song became an all-time popular national melody and it gave him country-wide fame. Afterwards, he recorded many patriotic songs for Pakistan Television. He is known as a singer of national songs.

Popular songs

References

1944 births
Living people
People from Delhi
Pakistani male singers